Chwaka is a medieval Swahili historic site next to the village of Chwaka located in Micheweni District of Pemba North Region, Tanzania. There is an excavated Swahili mosque on the site.

The archaeological site is clearly marked from the road and is open to the public. On the entire island of Pemba, these ruins are among the best kept. This location has early 13th-century inscriptions. However, Harun Bin Ali, the son of Mkame Ndune of Pujini. The settlement, which covered an area of  featured a grand palace-fortress, banquet halls, two mosques, an ironworks, and a harbor in a nearby creek. The town was abandoned in the 16th century. 

The massive mosque's walls and its gate arches are still in place today. Remains (bowls, ceramics) that were discovered during excavations are now on display at the Albert Museum in London as well as the Stone Town Museum in Stone Town, which is temporarily closed due to the collapse of a portion of the old palace. According to legend, Harun's wife requested that seeds be combined with the mortar to hold the little mosque known as Msikiti Chooko, or "the mosque of green grains," together. Several tombs, including Harun's, have been uncovered behind the mosque.

See also
Historic Swahili settlements
 Archaeology of Pemba Island

References

Swahili people
Swahili city-states
Swahili culture
Pemba Island